Belinda Russell (born ca. 1978 in Biloela, Queensland, Australia) is an Australian television newsreader, weather presenter and journalist.

Russell currently presents the weather on Nine News Sydney on Friday and Saturday

She has previously been a co-host of Weekend Today and co-host of Today Extra on Friday.

Career 
Belinda started her career at Network 10 in Brisbane in 1999, where she produced kids environment shows, and thereafter she joined the news team as a reporter.

In 2002, she moved to London and joined Sky News as a producer, becoming one of few Australian journalists to work on-camera for a British television program.

Nine Network 
Russell returned to Australia in 2007 and joined Nine Network's program A Current Affair as a reporter in Sydney.

In 2013, she was appointed the weeknight weather presenter for Nine News Sydney.

In 2019, Belinda was announced as a co-host of Today Extra on Fridays while Sylvia Jeffreys was on maternity leave. This turned into a permanent Friday role from 2020 onwards.

In November 2021, it was announced that Russell will co-host Weekend Today alongside Charles Croucher and Richard Wilkins from January 2022 replacing Maddern who resigned from the Nine Network.

In March 2023, Russell announced her resignation as co-host of Weekend Today.

Personal life

Early life 
Russell was born in St George, Queensland, Australia.

She completed a degree of Communications and Journalism at the University of Southern Queensland.

Family 
She is married to Mark Calvert; she met him in the UK while working at Sky News.

Russell has 3 daughters; their names are Coco, Tallulah, and Maddi.

References 

Nine News presenters
Living people
Australian television journalists
Australian women television presenters
Australian women journalists
Nine News
Year of birth missing (living people)